Embrace the Emptiness is the debut album by Evoken. Originally released in 1998 by Elegy Records. It was re-released by Solitude Productions in 2006 with a new layout.

Track listing

Credits 
 John Paradiso – Guitars/Vocals
 Nick Orlando – Guitars
 Steve Moran – Bass
 Vince Verkay – Drums
 Dario Derna – Keyboards
 Charles Lamb – Session Cello

References

Evoken albums
1998 debut albums